Antonio Esposito (born 15 July 1950) is an Italian singer, songwriter and musician.

Career 

Esposito was born in Naples.  He started playing percussions in his teenage years. In the early 1970s, he played sessions and recorded with musicians such as Alan Sorrenti, Don Cherry, Don Moye, Gato Barbieri, Eumir Deodato, Brian Auger, Gilberto Gil and Pino Daniele. In 1975 he recorded his first solo album, Rosso napoletano, in collaboration with Paul Buckmaster.

Esposito is mostly well known for his 1984 hit single "Kalimba de Luna" from his album Il grande esploratore. After winning the Un disco per l'estate music festival, it charted in Italy and Switzerland, and a cover by Boney M reached No. 17 in Germany.

In 1987, his single "Papa Chico" was No. 2 in The Netherlands for 5 weeks and No. 3 in Belgium for 2 weeks.

In 1986 he won the Nastro d'argento Award for the soundtrack of Lina Wertmuller's film Camorra (A Story of Streets, Women and Crime).

Discography 

 Rosso napoletano (1975)
 Processione sul mare (1976)
 Gente distratta (1977)
 La banda del sole (1978)
 Tamburo (1982)
 Il grande esploratore (1984)
 As tu às (1985)
 Tony Esposito (1987)
 Villaggio globale (1990)
 Tropico (1996)
 Tony Esposito (anthology, 1997)
 Viaggio tribale (2003)
 Sentirai (2011)
 Tam Tam Bass (2013)

Collaborations
 1972: Aria – Alan Sorrenti
 1973: Come un vecchio incensiere all'alba di un villaggio deserto – Alan Sorrenti
 1973: Il re non-si diverte – Roberto Vecchioni
 1973: Opera buffa – Francesco Guccini
 1974: I buoni e i cattivi – Edoardo Bennato
 1974: Stanze di vita quotidiana – Francesco Guccini
 1974: Francesco De Gregori – Francesco De Gregori
 1975: Io che non-sono l'imperatore – Edoardo Bennato
 1975: La valle dei templi – Perigeo
 1975: La torre di Babele – Edoardo Bennato
 1976: Automobili – Lucio Dalla
 1977: Samarcanda – Roberto Vecchioni
 1981: Vai mò – Pino Daniele
 2007: Il mio nome è Pino Daniele e vivo qui – Pino Daniele
 2008: Ricomincio da 30 – Pino Daniele

External links 
 
 
 Last.fm
 Italianprog.com

1950 births
Living people
Musicians from Naples
Italian singer-songwriters
Italian pop musicians
Italian Italo disco musicians
Italian drummers
Male drummers
Nastro d'Argento winners
Spanish-language singers of Italy
Italian jazz drummers
Male jazz musicians
Italian film score composers
Italian male film score composers